This is a list of windmills in Malta, that include those on Malta and Gozo. Most windmills in Malta were built while the islands were under the rule of the Order of St. John, by the Cottoner and the Manoel Foundations, while other were built in the British Colonial period. There are 48 windmills (apart from those demolished that would add up to at least 69) which were included on the antiques list of 1932 and scheduled as cultural buildings by the Malta Environment and Planning Authority (MEPA). The windmills form an integral part of Maltese history. Those in the countryside were used exclusively for food production, such as wheat, barley or vines, while some of those within the fortified walled cities in Valletta and the Three Cities had a military use, for the production of gunpowder.

At the time of construction, each windmills' tower could site the next windmill from distance, similar to military watchtowers, in order to learn whether the others are working on that day. An instrument called bronja, colloquially known as tronga, is commonly associated with the functioning of windmills. The tronja is a sea snail that is modified, with a hole at one end, and when blown it creates a strong noise reaching a large distance in a given Maltese village. This was useful to inform the people that the windmills are operating that day due to being a windy day, by which the sails turn for general function.

The architecture of a windmill could differ from one to another, but in general a Maltese windmill has similar characteristics. A tower has a built circular staircase inside it that leads to the top. Rooms are built around the tower, giving both support to the tower and used for the general storage of production. A windmill could simultaneously be the family residence of the miller. Each tower has an approximate height of 15 meters and a radius of 1.5 meters. A functioning Maltese windmill has six sails. The first mills were built in the 16th century, however these were post mills. The oldest tower mills were built in the late 17th century on the island of Malta while the latest were built on Gozo in the late 19th or early 20th centuries. The windmills were eventually replaced with the industrial development of steam mills, circa 1900, but managed to keep competitive production throughout the mid-twentieth century.

Malta has the highest density of windmills in the world, having approximately a windmill for each , which is higher than the Netherlands which is famous for its windmills. At one point there were more than the present amount of windmills on the islands, but many were demolished over the years. Despite the survival of a significant number of windmills, only three still have their sails in place. Other more traditional mills in Malta include those that made use of animals, such as horses and donkeys, to turn the mill.

List

Malta

Gozo

Notes

References

Further reading

External links

Malta
 
Windmills